Lewis Christie (born 30 August 1988) is a Scottish professional ice hockey defenceman who is currently playing for NIHL side Milton Keynes Lightning, who he rejoined in 2019. Christie had last played for the Milton Keynes Thunder.

External links

1988 births
Living people
Basingstoke Bison players
Belfast Giants players
Dundee Stars players
Edinburgh Capitals players
Milton Keynes Lightning players
Milton Keynes Thunder players
Scottish ice hockey defencemen